The First Galaxy G1 is a board game with a science fiction theme published by Hungry Owl Publications in 1985.

Contents
The First Galaxy G1 is a game for 2–5 players in which the players fly rockets around the mapboard, and try to reassemble the scattered pieces of their own space stations, which have been spread over a spiral galaxy.

Components
mounted gameboard
5 rocket tokens
 5 space stations (4 parts each)
56 Supply cards
60 Fuel cell pieces
1 Standard die
2 10-sided dice
Rules

Reception
Jon Conner reviewed The First Galaxy - G1 for Imagine magazine, and stated that "All in all this is not a serious game but if you feel like some fun which involves some tactical thinking (perhaps after a hard game of Starship Troopers) then you will probably enjoy The First Galaxy - G1."

References

Board games introduced in 1985